Birchfield may refer to:

Places
 Birchfield, Birmingham, England, United Kingdom, a suburb of Birmingham
 Birchfield, New Jersey, United States an unincorporated community
 Birchfield, Washington, United States an unincorporated community
 Birchfield Halt railway station, a former railway station in Rothes, Scotland, United Kingdom
 St Kieran's College, formerly known as Birchfield College, Roman Catholic secondary school in Kilkenny, Ireland

Other uses
 Birchfield (surname)
 Birchfield (car), a former Australian car manufacturer
 Birchfield v. North Dakota, a United States Supreme Court case about testing of drivers suspected to be under the influence